Timofey Pavlovich Mozgov (born July 16, 1986) is a Russian former professional basketball player. Mozgov won an NBA championship with the Cleveland Cavaliers in 2016, becoming one of the first Russians to do so, alongside Sasha Kaun. As a member of the Russian national team, he won the bronze medal at the 2012 Summer Olympics, as well as a bronze medal at EuroBasket 2011. Mozgov signed with the Lakers in 2016 before being traded to the Nets in the 2017 offseason. In the 2018 offseason, he was traded to the Magic before returning to Khimki in 2019.

Professional career

LenVo St. Petersburg (2004–2006) 
Mozgov began his professional career with LenVo St. Petersburg, in the Russian second-tier division, during the 2004–05 season.

Samara (2006) 
In 2006, Mozgov moved to CSK VVS Samara 2, the from Samara.

Khimki (2006–2010) 
Before the 2006–07 season, Mozgov joined Khimki Moscow Region, where he played through the 2009–10 season.

New York Knicks (2010–2011)

In 2010, Mozgov signed a three-year, $9.7 million contract with the New York Knicks.

On January 30, 2011, after a three-week stint on the bench, Mozgov finally saw significant minutes against the Detroit Pistons, scoring 23 points and grabbing 14 rebounds in a 124–106 victory. He played 40 minutes and was treated to loud chants of "Mozgov! Mozgov!" in the final minute.

Denver Nuggets (2011)

On February 22, 2011, Mozgov was traded to the Nuggets in a three-way blockbuster deal, which also involved the Minnesota Timberwolves that brought Carmelo Anthony to New York.

Return to Khimki (2011) 
On July 21, 2011, Mozgov joined Khimki Moscow Region for the second time during the 2011 NBA lockout.

Return to Denver (2011–2015) 
On January 21, 2012, Mozgov scored a season high 16 points in a double overtime 119-114 win against his former team, the Knicks.

On July 27, 2013, Mozgov re-signed with the Nuggets.

On January 17, 2014, Mozgov recorded a career high 5 blocks, alongside scoring 10 points and grabbing 11 rebounds, in a 117-109 loss to the Cleveland Cavaliers. On April 10, 2014, he recorded career highs in points and rebounds with 23 and 29, respectively, in a 100–99 win over the Golden State Warriors.

Cleveland Cavaliers (2015–2016)
On January 7, 2015, Mozgov was traded, along with a 2015 second-round pick, to the Cleveland Cavaliers in exchange for two protected 2015 first-round picks (via Oklahoma City and Memphis). Having always previously worn number 25, he was forced to change that upon joining the Cavaliers due to the franchise having the number retired for Mark Price. He instead chose number 20 as it was the number his father, a Soviet handball player, used while he played the sport. On January 9, he made his debut for the Cavaliers, recording nine points and eight rebounds off the bench in a 112–94 loss to Golden State.

On June 4, 2015, he became the first Russian to play in the NBA Finals, as the Cavaliers lost Game 1 of the series to the Warriors. The Cavaliers went on to lose the series in six games; Mozgov started all six.

On June 23, 2015, Cleveland exercised its option on Mozgov's contract for the 2015–16 season. He played a reduced role throughout the season, as the Cavaliers made it to the 2016 NBA Finals, where they defeated the Warriors in a rematch. Mozgov and teammate Sasha Kaun became the first Russians to win an NBA title.

Los Angeles Lakers (2016–2017)
On July 8, 2016, Mozgov signed a four-year, $64 million contract with the Los Angeles Lakers. The Lakers received "league-wide criticism" for the size of Mozgov's contract. The contract has been described as "huge", "dreadful", and "indefensible".

Mozgov made his debut for the Lakers in their season opener on October 26, 2016, recording 12 points and eight rebounds in a 120–114 win over the Houston Rockets. On March 14, 2017, the Lakers shut down a healthy Mozgov for the rest of the season to give the majority of playing time over the final 15 games to the team's younger players.

Brooklyn Nets (2017–2018)
On June 22, 2017, Mozgov was traded, along with D'Angelo Russell, to the Brooklyn Nets in exchange for Brook Lopez and the rights to Kyle Kuzma, the 27th pick in the 2017 NBA draft.

On July 6, 2018, Mozgov was traded, along with the draft rights to Hamidou Diallo, a 2021 second-round draft pick, and cash considerations, to the Charlotte Hornets in exchange for Dwight Howard. A day later, he was traded again, this time to the Orlando Magic in a three-team deal.

On July 6, 2019, Mozgov was waived by the Magic without having played a game, due to a knee injury. On November 28, 2019, the NBA approved the Magic's petition to have Mozgov's salary removed from their books due to the knee injury.

Third stint with Khimki (2019–2021)
On July 31, 2019, Mozgov signed a one-year deal to return to his home country and play once again for Khimki of the VTB United League and the EuroLeague. However, he did not play in the 2019–20 season due to his knee injury.

On April 12, 2021, Mozgov played in his first professional game since 2018, logging six points, six rebounds, and one assist in a 89–83 win over Enisey.

Runa (2021–2022)
On December 23, 2021, Mozgov signed with Runa Basket Moscow of the Russian Basketball Super League 1.

National team career

Mozgov has also been a member of the senior Russian national basketball team. He played at EuroBasket 2009, EuroBasket 2011, and the 2012 Summer Olympics, winning bronze medals at the latter two.

Career statistics

NBA

Regular season

|-
| style="text-align:left;"| 
| style="text-align:left;"| New York
| 34 || 14 || 13.5 || .464 || .000 || .705 || 3.1 || .4 || .4 || .7 || 4.0
|-
| style="text-align:left;"| 
| style="text-align:left;"| Denver
| 11 || 0 || 6.0 || .524 || .000 || .750 || 1.5 || .0 || .1 || .2 || 2.5
|-
| style="text-align:left;"| 
| style="text-align:left;"| Denver
| 44 || 35 || 15.6 || .526 || .000 || .684 || 4.1 || .5 || .3 || 1.0 || 5.4
|-
| style="text-align:left;"| 
| style="text-align:left;"| Denver
| 41 || 1 || 8.9 || .506 || .000 || .769 || 2.6 || .2 || .1 || .4 || 2.6
|-
| style="text-align:left;"| 
| style="text-align:left;"| Denver
| 82 || 30 || 21.6 || .523 || .167 || .754 || 6.4 || .8 || .3 || 1.2 || 9.4
|-
| style="text-align:left;"| 
| style="text-align:left;"| Denver
| 35 || 35 || 25.6 || .504 || .333 || .733 || 7.8 || .5 || .4 || 1.2 || 8.5
|-
| style="text-align:left;"| 
| style="text-align:left;"| Cleveland
| 46 || 45 || 25.0 || .590 || .000 || .708 || 6.9 || .8 || .4 || 1.2 || 10.6
|-
| style="text-align:left;background:#afe6ba;"| †
| style="text-align:left;"| Cleveland
| 76 || 48 || 17.4 || .565 || .143 || .716 || 4.4 || .4 || .3 || .8 || 6.3
|-
| style="text-align:left;"| 
| style="text-align:left;"| L.A. Lakers
| 54 || 52 || 20.4 || .515 || .000 || .808 || 4.9 || .8 || .3 || .6 || 7.4
|-
| style="text-align:left;"| 
| style="text-align:left;"| Brooklyn
| 31 || 13 || 11.6 || .559 || .222 || .767 || 3.2 || .4 || .2 || .4 || 4.2
|- class="sortbottom"
| style="text-align:center;" colspan="2"| Career
| 454 || 273 || 18.0 || .535 || .190 || .738 || 4.9 || .6 || .3 || .8 || 6.8

Playoffs

|-
| style="text-align:left;"| 2012
| style="text-align:left;"| Denver
| 7 || 5 || 14.1 || .480 || .000 || .500 || 3.3 || .4 || .3 || .9 || 4.0
|-
| style="text-align:left;"| 2015
| style="text-align:left;"| Cleveland
| 20 || 20 || 26.5 || .500 || .000 || .790 || 7.3 || 0.9 || .4 || 1.8 || 10.6
|-
| style="text-align:left;background:#afe6ba;"| 2016†
| style="text-align:left;"| Cleveland
| 13 || 0|| 5.8|| .400|| .000 || .750 || 1.6|| 0.2 || .2 || 0.2|| 1.2
|- class="sortbottom"
| style="text-align:center;" colspan="2"| Career
| 40 || 25 || 17.6 || .589 || .000 || .763 || 4.8 || 3.5 || .3 || 1.1 || 6.4

See also

 List of European basketball players in the United States

References

External links

 Timofey Mozgov at euroleague.net
 Timofey Mozgov at fiba.com

1986 births
Living people
2010 FIBA World Championship players
Basketball players at the 2012 Summer Olympics
BC Khimki players
Brooklyn Nets players
Centers (basketball)
Cleveland Cavaliers players
Denver Nuggets players
Los Angeles Lakers players
Medalists at the 2012 Summer Olympics
National Basketball Association players from Russia
New York Knicks players
Olympic basketball players of Russia
Olympic bronze medalists for Russia
Olympic medalists in basketball
Russian expatriate basketball people in the United States
Russian men's basketball players
Basketball players from Saint Petersburg
Undrafted National Basketball Association players